Stranger Songs is the eighth studio album by American singer-songwriter Ingrid Michaelson. It was released on June 28, 2019, by Cabin 24 Records. The album contains music that is inspired by Netflix television series Stranger Things, with the album released shortly prior to the premiere of its third season. In addition to the album, Michaelson is composing music for a stage adaptation of the 2004 film The Notebook. In an interview with Entertainment Weekly, Michaelson described Stranger Songs as a "natural extension" of her work on The Notebook. The lead single from the album, "Missing You", was released on May 10, 2019.

Track listing

Charts

References

2019 albums
Science fiction concept albums
Ingrid Michaelson albums
Albums produced by Sam de Jong
Albums produced by Jason Evigan
Albums produced by Alex Hope (songwriter)
Albums produced by Cason Cooley
Music based on television series
Stranger Things (TV series)